Julian Fałat (30 July 1853 in Tuligłowy near Lwów – 9 July 1929 in Bystra Śląska) was one of the most prolific Polish painters of watercolor and one of the country's foremost landscape painters as well as one of the leading Polish impressionists.

Biography
Fałat first studied under Władysław Łuszczkiewicz at the Kraków School of Fine Arts, and then at the Art Academy of Munich. After several trips throughout Europe and Asia in 1885, Fałat compiled a collection of studies from his voyages which would become useful later in the development of his artwork. Themes typical of Fałat's painting are Polish landscapes, hunting scenes, portraits, and studies from his voyages. In 1886, Fałat accepted an invitation from future German Emperor Wilhelm II to serve as court painter in Berlin.

Fałat died in Bystra Śląska on July 9, 1929. A museum in Poland, called Fałatówka, is devoted to him. 

Out of his three children, Kazimierz (Togo) (1904–1981) continued to paint in watercolour. 

Some works, having been looted under German occupation, very occasionally reappear in sales-rooms. In December 2010, two such paintings, "The Hunt" and "Off to the Hunt" were seized by U.S. authorities from auction houses in New York City. The works are to be repatriated to Poland's National Museum of Art in Warsaw. Some later works by Julian's son Kazimierz (Togo)(1904-81), produced in the same style after Togo settled in England (1947–), are largely in the hands of his later family.

Fałat used to say:
"Polish art ought to convey our history and our beliefs, our qualities as well as our defects; it must be the quintessence of our soil, our sky, and our ideals."

See also 
 Academy of Fine Arts in Kraków
 Bielsko-Biała Museum
 Culture of Kraków
 Young Poland

References

Bibliography
Maciej Masłowski: Julian Fałat, Warsaw 1964, ed."Arkady".

External links 

 Julian Fałat, biography (in Polish)
 Julian Fałat's Villa
 U.S. returns paintings looted by Nazis to Poland

1853 births
1929 deaths
People from Lviv Oblast
Polish landscape painters
Polish Impressionist painters
Jan Matejko Academy of Fine Arts alumni
Court painters
Academy of Fine Arts, Munich alumni